Holy Sepulchre Cemetery is a Roman Catholic cemetery of the Archdiocese of Chicago, located in the village of Alsip, Illinois, in Worth Township, southwest of Chicago.

Cemetery grounds
Holy Sepulchre Cemetery is the westernmost of ten cemeteries in a two mile radius in and near the Mount Greenwood neighborhood of Chicago. The large number of cemeteries was the basis for the fictitious "Seven Holy Tombs" area in several books by author John R. Powers. As is typical of the area, the cemetery is bordered on all sides by major roads and is surrounded by commercial and residential zones.

Its most prominent feature is the Mausoleum of the Archangels. Dedicated by Cardinal Bernardin in 1993, the Mausoleum features life-size statues of the Archangels Michael, Gabriel, and Raphael. Each statue sits in the midst of a small park-like setting, with private seating areas and marble lined halls. This type of mausoleum is also known as a "garden crypt". Unlike the more traditional mausoleum layout, the burial vaults are in the exterior walls, thus eliminating interior corridors.

Burial practices

The headstones in the newer areas lie flat (known as "lawn level markers") to facilitate mowing and groundskeeping. It is possible to have upright markers for family plots, but this requires purchasing multiple gravesites and using a single, larger marker. The older areas have upright headstones that run the gamut from typical markers to fanciful and artistic. There are also some mausoleums for above-ground interments.

History
Holy Sepulchre Cemetery was consecrated on July 4, 1923, on the site of the Worth racetrack, which was demolished in 1911. Between 1911 and 1923 the site was used for state militia training and stockades. The first burial was on July 5, 1923.

Notable interments
 Dawn Brancheau (1969–2010), animal trainer at SeaWorld
 Frank J. Corr (1877–1934), U.S. politician
 Steve Cusack (1876–1952), Major League Baseball umpire
 Richard J. Daley (1902–1976), Mayor of Chicago from 1955 to 1976
 Kevin Hickey (1956–2012), Chicago White Sox player
 Ralph Metcalfe (1910–1978), U.S. Congressman, four-time Olympic medalist
 Helen Morgan (1900–1941), singer and actress
 John Panozzo (1948–1996), Styx drummer and co-founder
 Pants Rowland (1878–1969), American baseball manager
 Dan Ryan, Jr. (1894–1961), Cook County Board president

References

External links

 
 
 Holy Sepulchre Cemetery, Catholic Cemeteries of Chicago

Roman Catholic cemeteries in Illinois
Cemeteries in Cook County, Illinois
Roman Catholic Archdiocese of Chicago